The Italy national cricket team is the men's team that represents the country of Italy in international cricket. They have been an associate member of the International Cricket Council (ICC) since 1995, having previously been an affiliate member since 1984. The Italian national cricket team is administered by the Italian Cricket Federation.

History

Early history

The earliest mention of cricket in Italy is of a match played by Admiral Nelson's sailors in Bayside, NY in 1793 during a stop in Naples harbour. Around the end of the 19th century, several combined cricket and association football clubs formed, including the world-famous A.C. Milan, which was originally the Milan Cricket and Football Club and the first Italian football team Genoa Cricket and Football Club, which was originally the Genoa Cricket & Athletic Club. But these clubs soon forgot about cricket and concentrated on football. Cricket started to be revived after the Second World War. Cricket flourished in Rome in the 1960s at a superb field which looked across to St. Peter's dome from Villa Doria Pamphili. The Australian and British embassies, the UN Food and Agriculture Organization, the Commonwealth War Graves Association, the Venerable English College and Beda College fielded teams which competed for the Rome Ashes there until, in the 1970s, the Villa became a public park.

When cricket resumed in Rome on other grounds at the end of the 1970s, four of the Villa Doria Pamphili era players formed in 1980 the Doria Pamphili Cricket Club: the Italian-Sri Lankian Francis Alphonsus Jayarajah, the Italian-Indian Massimo da Costa, the Australian Desmond O'Grady and the Syrian Issam Kahale

In the same period some cricket was played in the northern part of Italy with the Milan Cricket Club being formed in the 70's. and Euratom CC in the 80's.

Modern history

The "Federazione Cricket Italiana" (Italian Cricket Federation) was formed in 1980, and they became an affiliate member of the ICC in 1984, and were promoted to associate member in 1995.

The first record match by the Italian National Team was touring their first UK Tour in August 1984 and played a week of cricket against local London clubs, the first losing against Enfield CC, but ending on a high with their first win in the last match against North Middlesex.

The first international match played by the Italian National team was against Denmark in 1989, ending in a draw.

After years of matches against neighboring nations such as France and Germany, in 1996, Italy took part in the first European Championship in Denmark, finishing seventh after beating Israel in a play-off. They took part in the ICC Trophy for the first time in the 1997 tournament and performed poorly, finishing joint last out of the 22 participants. They finished fifth in the following year's European Championship.

In 1999, Italy took part in a quadrangular tournament in Gibraltar also featuring France and Israel. They won the tournament, beating the hosts in the final. They finished fifth in Division One of the European Championship the following year and were due to participate in the 2001 ICC Trophy, but pulled out at the last minute due to a dispute over the eligibility of four players.

The 2002 European Championship saw Italy finish sixth in Division One, relegating them for 2004 to Division Two, which they promptly won. This qualified them for the repêchage tournament for the 2005 ICC Trophy in early 2005 in Kuala Lumpur, Malaysia. They finished seventh in that tournament after beating Zambia in a play-off.

They took part in Division One of the European Championship in 2006, finishing fifth. In May–June 2007, they travelled to Darwin, Australia, to take part in Division Three of the World Cricket League. They finished seventh after beating Fiji in a play-off, and played in Division Four of the World Cricket League in 2008 to come third and remained in 2010 ICC World Cricket League Division Four. They came 2nd there to be promoted to 2011 ICC World Cricket League Division Three, where they came 4th to remain in 2013 ICC World Cricket League Division Three. They have a chance of reaching the 2015 Cricket World Cup, if it finishes in the top two in the 2013 ICC World Cricket League Division Three, and then in the top two of the 2013 Cricket World Cup Qualifier. An encouraging start to this tournament has witnessed wins over Oman (9 wickets) and United States (8 runs), followed by defeats, narrowly to Ireland (2 wickets) and more comprehensively against Kenya (7 wickets). After finishing last in this tournament they were relegated to Division Four in 2014.

In November 2013 they competed in the 2013 ICC World Twenty20 Qualifier in the UAE, their highest level of competition to date. They finished 9th place with victories over the US, and higher-ranked opponents in UAE and Namibia.

2018–present
In April 2018, the ICC decided to grant full Twenty20 International (T20I) status to all its members. Therefore, all Twenty20 matches played between Italy and other ICC members since 1 January 2019 has been a full T20I.

In September 2018, Italy qualified from Group B of the 2018–19 ICC World Twenty20 Europe Qualifier to the Regional Finals of the tournament.

Italy played their first T20I against Germany in May 2019.

From August 2019, Italy will play in the 2019–21 ICC Cricket World Cup Challenge League.

In 2023, it was reported that Italy had pursued a strategy of recruiting professional cricketers from Australia and England to play in the regional final of the 2022–23 ICC Men's T20 World Cup Europe Qualifier. The recruits have only tenuous connections with Italy but meet ICC regulations by virtue of holding Italian passports.

Tournament record

World Twenty20 Qualifier

2013: 9th place

World Cricket League

2007: 7th place (Division Three) – relegated
2008: 3rd place (Division Four)
2010: 2nd place (Division Four) – promoted
2011: 4th place (Division Three)
2013: 6th place (Division Three) – relegated
2014: 4th place (Division Four)
2016: 6th place (Division Four) – relegated
2017: 4th place (Division Five) – relegated to regional tournaments

ICC Trophy

1979: Not eligible – not an ICC member
1982: Not eligible – not an ICC member
1986 to 1994 inclusive: Not eligible – ICC affiliate member
1997: equal 21st place
2001: Withdrew (see above)
2005: Did not qualify
 2009: Did not qualify
 2014: Did not qualify

European Championship

1996: 7th place
1998: 5th place
2000: 5th place (Division One)
2002: 6th place (Division One)
2004: Division Two winners
2006: 5th place (Division One)
2008: 5th place (Division One)
2010: 6th place (Division One)

European T20 Championship Division One
2011: 2nd place 
2013: 1st place

Squad
Italy's squad for the 2018–19 ICC World Twenty20 Europe Qualifier in August 2018 were the following players:

 Gayashan Munasinghe (c)
 Madupa Fernando
 Rakibul Hasan
 Fida Hussain
 Gian-Piero Meade
 Joy Perera
 Manpreet Singh
 Anam Mollik
 Baljit Singh
 Zahid Cheema
 Tharindu Fernando
 Jaspreet Singh
 Nicholas Maiolo
 Michael Ross

Other players, who were part of Italy's squad at the 2017 ICC World Cricket League Division Five.

 Alessandro Bonora
 Damian Crowley
 Crishan Kalugamage
 Supun Tharanga
 Peter Petricola
 Carl Sandri
 Charanjeet Singh

Gareth Berg was chosen for European T20 World Cup Qualifier in 2019 but removed from the squad by Hampshire due to a fixture clash.

Records and Statistics 

International Match Summary — Italy
 
Last updated 6 November 2022

Twenty20 International 
 Highest team total: 210/5 v. Croatia on 16 July 2022 at Kerava National Cricket Ground, Kerava.
 Highest individual score: 87*, Marcus Campopiano v. Spain on 6 November 2022 at Desert Springs Cricket Ground, Almería.  
 Best individual bowling figures: 4/11, Gayashan Munasinghe v. Guernsey on 16 June 2019 at College Field, Saint Peter Port.

Most T20I runs for Italy

Most T20I wickets for Italy

T20I record versus other nations

Records complete to T20I #1876. Last updated 6 November 2022.

See also
 List of Italy Twenty20 International cricketers

References

External links
Official website
Cricinfo Italy

Cricket in Italy
National cricket teams
Cricket
Italy in international cricket